Bring Me the Head of Prince Charming (1991) is a fantasy novel by Roger Zelazny and Robert Sheckley.

Introduction
Every millennium a big contest is waged between the forces of good, and the forces of evil, a contest that determines the turn of events in the upcoming millennium. On the side of evil, the demon and master of sabotage, Azzie Elbub and on the side of good is the angel Babriel. Both have to abide by rules and customs set by their respective sects. 
The contest is a test of human nature and takes the form of a fairy tale involving two humans, a prince and a princess. Their choices will dictate the victor.

See also

 Prince Charming, stock fairy tale character which the book satirizes.

External links
 

Novels by Roger Zelazny
Novels by Robert Sheckley
1991 novels